The Ho-Am Prize in Community Service was established in 1990 by Kun-Hee Lee, the Chairman of Samsung, to honour the late Chairman, Lee Byung-chul, the founder of the company. The Ho-Am Prize in Community Service is one of six prizes awarded annually, covering the five categories of Science, Engineering, Medicine, Arts, and Community Service, plus a Special Prize, which are named after the late Chairman's sobriquet (art-name or pen name), Ho-Am.

The Ho-Am Prize in Community Service is presented each year, together with the other prizes, to individuals of Korean heritage who have furthered the welfare of humanity through distinguished accomplishments in the field of Community Service.

Prizewinners of Ho-Am Prize in Community Service
Source: Ho-Am Foundation

See also
 Ho-Am Prize in Science
 Ho-Am Prize in the Arts
 Ho-Am Prize in Engineering
 Ho-Am Prize in Medicine

References

External links 
 Previous Laureates
 This Year Laureates

Humanitarian and service awards
Society of South Korea
Awards established in 1991
South Korean awards
Samsung
Annual events in South Korea
1991 establishments in South Korea